Highs in the Mid-Sixties, Volume 19 (subtitled Michigan, Part 3) is a compilation album in the Highs in the Mid-Sixties series, featuring recordings that were released in Michigan.  Highs in the Mid-Sixties, Volume 5 and Highs in the Mid-Sixties, Volume 6 are earlier volumes in the series featuring bands from this state.

Release data
This album was released in 1985 as an LP by AIP Records (as #AIP-10028).

Notes on the tracks
One of Iggy Pop's first band was the Iguanas (who are pictured on the cover); the band was formed in 1963 when he was still in high school, and he was the band's drummer.  After he left this band and joined The Prime Movers, the other bandmembers began calling him "Iggy" due to his association with the Iguanas.  This previously unreleased track comes from early demo tapes and is evidently the first song recorded where he was the songwriter.  AIP Records has also released a series of compilation albums of unreleased Iggy Pop material named after this band, called the Iguana Chronicles.

"Be Careful With Your Car-Full" (track 4) by the Royal Shandels (Don Gladden, Ron Oswalt, Jeff White, Neil Williams and Carl Zenoni) was recorded in Detroit at Golden World for the National Safety Council back in the days that seat belts were a fairly new addition to cars, and a bit before most mandatory seat belt laws were introduced.  The M.S.C. wanted to encourage their use, and this was played on national AM radio for about two years.

Track listing

Side 1

 The Tempests: "Look Away" (Sevison) — rel. 1963
 The Saharas: "This Mornin'" (P. F. Sloan)
 The Decisions: "Tears, Tears" (The Decisions)
 The Royal Shandels: "Be Careful with Your Car-Full" (Don Gladden/Ron Oswalt)
 The JuJus: "I'm Really Sorry" (Rick Stevens)
 The French Church: "Without Crying" (MacDonald/Cleary) — rel. 1966
 The Oxford 5: "Gloria" (Van Morrison)

Side 2
 The Iguanas: "Again and Again"
 The Beaubiens: "Time Passed"
 The Bells of Rhymny: "She'll be Back" (Burdick/Parsons/Dick Wagner)
 The Chessmen: "You Can't Catch Me" (Finchum/Motley/Evans/Griebe)
 The French Church: "Slapneck 1943" (Spratta/MacDonald)
 The Assortment: "Bless Our Hippie Home" (Fenstock/Roderie)
 The Orange Wedge: "From the Tomb to the Womb" (I.S.P.)

Pebbles (series) albums
1985 compilation albums
Music of Michigan
Seat belts